The chief minister of Sikkim is the head of the executive branch of the Government of Sikkim, the subnational authority of the Indian state of Sikkim. The chief minister acts as the head of government in the state, has formal presidency over the Council of Ministers and governs with the confidence of a majority in the elected Sikkim Legislative Assembly. 

Following elections to the Sikkim Legislative Assembly, the governor usually invites the party (or coalition) with a majority of seats to form the government. As such, the chief minister typically sits as a Member of the Legislative Assembly (MLA) and leads the largest party or a coalition of parties. The governor appoints the chief minister, whose council of ministers are collectively responsible to the assembly. Given that he has the confidence of the assembly, the chief minister's term is for five years and is subject to no term limits.
Since 1974, Sikkim has had five chief ministers. The first was Kazi Lhendup Dorjee of the Indian National Congress. Pawan Kumar Chamling of the Sikkim Democratic Front was the longest serving Chief Minister of Sikkim from 1994 to 2019. He occupied the office longer than all his predecessors put together and currently holds the record for longest serving CM in India. The 24 year old rule of Pawan Kumar Chamling ended in the 2019 Vidhan Sabha elections where Sikkim Krantikari Morcha emerged victorious. Prem Singh Tamang became Chief Minister on 27 May 2019.

List of officeholders

Timeline

Notes

References

External links
 List on worldstatesmen.org

Sikkim
 
Chief Ministers